Thecladoris tylonotoides is a species of beetle in the family Cerambycidae, the only species in the genus Thecladoris.

References

Hesperophanini